This is the full discography of American music duo Nina Sky. Together, they have released two studio albums, one extended play, 14 singles, and have appeared as a guest on 10 singles.

Albums

Studio albums

EPs

Mixtapes
 2004: The Nina Sky
 2005: La Conexión
 2006: 80's Babies
 2006: Back to the Future

Unreleased albums
 2007/2008/2009: Starting Today

Singles

As lead artist

As featured artist

Music videos

References

Discographies of American artists
Rhythm and blues discographies
Reggaeton discographies